Andrey Semyonov (born 16 August 1977) is a Russian sprinter. He competed in the men's 4 × 400 metres relay at the 2000 Summer Olympics.

References

External links
 

1977 births
Living people
Place of birth missing (living people)
Russian male sprinters
Olympic male sprinters
Olympic athletes of Russia
Athletes (track and field) at the 2000 Summer Olympics
World Athletics Championships athletes for Russia
World Athletics Indoor Championships medalists
Russian Athletics Championships winners
Universiade medalists in athletics (track and field)
Universiade silver medalists for Russia
Medalists at the 2003 Summer Universiade
21st-century Russian people